CyberSlam is an online Australian competitive gaming and technology business. It operates a number of online multiplayer gaming servers and a community forum. CyberSlam started out in 2003 under CBN Media as its gaming division, and some 10 years on in April 2013, has officially been relaunched in BETA under all-new management after almost three years of hiatus. Active community member ShauningtoN has confirmed that he is undertaking the 'CyberSlam Resurgence' project and thus far is funding it with no outside assistance.

CBN Media era (2003–2010) 

CyberSlam started out as the Tournament and gaming division of CBN Media, which operated between 2003 and the middle of 2010.

CyberSlam came into the public eye by hosting the Australian Halo PC Tournament, which saw JoshH (then known as HoOh++) flying to the United States of America for the International Halo PC Finals (2004).

CyberSlam's tournaments were run as a gaming democracy with players  submitting their ideas and suggestions on how the events could best be run. The games community directed the event, played in the event and submit feedback to the website managers for improving future events. Prizes were organised by Cyber Slam's managers to ensure the community is rewarded for their tournament support.

In May, 2004, CyberSlam hosted the Australian Battlefield Vietnam Tournament for Electronic Arts. This Tournament was of significant importance for online gaming in Australia as it set the precedent for all large Australian events that followed. The first prize was A$15,000 - the highest amount offered for any gaming event in Australia at the time - and was held completely online.

Australian Halo PC
The Australian Halo PC Tournament took place towards the end 2003 with online rounds. The final was held in Sydney at a LAN Cafe called iStarZone. HoOh++ was victorious on the day and was flown to the USA in early to 2004 to represent Australia at the International Halo PC Finals.

CyberSlam Halo Ladder
The Cyber Slam Halo Ladder was small tournament with a first prize of A$100 per week, to be played over 20 weeks. This took place from April, 2004.

Australian Battlefield Vietnam Tournament
The Australian Battlefield Vietnam Tournament was held completely online. The event started in May, 2004. Originally the event was announced as a 5vs5. This was soon changed to a 10vs10. The prize money for the event was A$15,000. The final was between 6pack and Lex Talions, with 6pack being victorious.

ACON5
In May 2005, CyberSlam were official hosts of the Australian Regional Finals of ACON5, the annual global gaming tournament sponsored by Universal abit and other hardware vendors. The qualifiers of the online components of both Counter-Strike 1.6 and Warcraft 3: The Frozen Throne were flown to Sydney for the LAN grand final. F-Zer0 (Function Zero) beat XR (Xtreme Revolution) and YGS (You Got Served) in CS1.6, while Philbot dominated the Warcraft 3 event. F-Zer0 were flown to China for the Global Finals, however Philbot could not attend and fellow qualifier Paz was sent in his place.

Cyber Slam Battlefield 2 Tournament
From October to November 2005, Cyber Slam held a Battlefield 2 tournament with a first prize of A$20,000. It was an online tournament which culminated in a grand final LAN event ("GameSphere") which was held at Sydney Gamers' League SGL on the 19th of November, 2005. Notably, for the two teams who made it to the grand final, aK^ and aK^^ (Anarchy Krew), it resulted in a substantial boost in their reputations as amongst Australia's best professional gamers. However, both sects of Anarchy Krew are highly competitive amongst themselves due to aK^^ consisting predominantly of former LAB (Little Aussie Battlers) members. LAB disbanded after the notoriety of its leader, "Booth", established the clan as the most egotistical players in competitive leagues – mainly due their highly skilled but arrogant players in comparison to the community. In the end, it was aK^ who won home the A$20,000.

Closure
From 2008 onward, popularity for Halo (at this stage CyberSlam's primary game) began to dwindle. A combination of this, and the fact that CyberSlam (which was hosted on the same servers as parent company CBN Media) had become the victim of several security attacks, meant that the size of the active community had by this stage dropped to level that made investing the time and money required to fix the aforementioned security problems unfeasible. It therefore followed, that in the middle of 2010, CBN Media 'pulled the pin' on CyberSlam. The CyberSlam Homepage at this stage read:

While this alone saddened the few remaining active members, unfortunately with its shutdown also went many precious memories, screenshots and videos that had accumulated over many years.

'CyberSlam Resurgence' Project (2013 – ) 

After seven years of having a dedicated forum and gaming servers to use, for over two years, CyberSlam's Halo faithful resorted to a Facebook Group that was set up by a member known under the gaming alias Ducky. The 100-strong group used the page as an open-forum and attempted to organize Halo PC online scrimmages, though the lack of dedicated servers or a Ventrilo voice server made it hard to co-ordinate and ultimately the group lost interest. Fortunes changed in April 2013, when prominent CyberSlam community member hauningtoN, after obtaining CBN Media's blessing, assumed control of the CyberSlam nameplate and immediately started work on the 'Resurgence' project which he is funding completely off his own bat, though the website is accepting donations from a Donations Page

The project was aimed at giving the CyberSlam community a home again, with a dedicated forum heavily inspired by the previous bulletin board. ShauningtoN has also set up Halo PC and Halo Custom Edition servers with the view of expanding the title list when the community gets back on its feet.

To boost player count and to increase the ease in which someone could join in, ShauningtoN has made his own portable and lightweight pre-customised distributions of Halo PC and Halo Custom Edition that are specifically designed for use in the CyberSlam servers.

Logo, online website and forum
For the resurgence, heavy inspiration was taken from the original CyberSlam logo and page layouts. A fresh new colour scheme was adopted to provide some distance between the two generations of CyberSlam. The iconic 'Slam-Square' remains, this time with the text 'RESURGENCE' watermarked in its upper half. 

The main-landing page is based on Word-Press and the bulletin board is based on a purpose-built 'pro-silver' theme for phpbb.

Gaming servers
At the current, CyberSlam is operating 3 Halo PC servers, and 3 Halo CE servers in addition to a dedicated Ventrilo channel.
PC: CyberSlam.com.au 1 – MLG – No Lead – Small to medium size maps, with [mlg|mlg] variants for competitive play.
PC: CyberSlam.com.au 2 – Big Maps – No Lead – Medium to large maps for vehicular combat and long-distance battles.
PC: CyberSlam.com.au 3 – Private Scrims – No Lead – No set rotation, map cycle is set by users of private server.
CE: CyberSlam.com.au 1  MLG – o Lead – Small to medium size maps, with [mlg|mlg] variants for competitive play.
CE: CyberSlam.com.au 2 – Big Maps – No Lead – Medium to large maps for vehicular combat and long-distance battles.
CE: CyberSlam.com.au 3 – Private Scrims – No Lead – No set rotation, map cycle is set by users of private server.

All of these servers are running the SAPP extension plugins that have removed CD hash and version checking when a client joins the game, thus increasing the number of possible players. SAPP also disables the need to 'lead' (leading a technique that was required during online play due to its unoptimized Netcode.  It required the player to fire bullets in anticipation of where an opponent would likely be, not where they currently appeared to the player.)

Public FTP share
ShauningtoN also announced that there will be a public FTP space for the community to use to share community created content such as machinima and other related content. It is believed it will be similar in principle and function to the 'hogsareus' sharedrive that used to exist.

Competitions
In celebration of the resurgence, when BETA testing of the servers and website has complete, ShauningtoN has confirmed there will be a launch competition/tournament.

References 

 WILD - Coverage of the Cyber Slam Battlefield 2 Tournament on Australian Television, Channel 7, Saturday 31st Dec, 2005 12:00pm – 1:00pm EST Australians on target at Cyber Games - By Louisa Hearn, Sydney Morning Herald, November 18, 2005.
 GamersHell.com - Out of Hell Information about the BF2 Tournament, October 28, 2005.
 Blue's News Competition entry for the Cyber Slam Battlefield 2 event, October 28, 2005.
 GotFrag eSports - Information about ACON 5 event, (registration required). Acon5 Australia Editorial - Opinion by Mike 'azog' Longley, who later assisted in the running of the ACON5 Australian grand final. AusXbox - Information about the Australian Battlefield Vietnam Tournament. 3DAvenue - Information and write-up about Cyber Slam Halo event. Related links 
 Cyber Slam (main site)
 Cyber Slam Forums (direct link to forums)
 ACL-Pro (Console-focused Halo Community'')

Online companies of Australia